Chapaleufú Department is a department of Argentina in La Pampa Province.  The capital city of the department is Intendente Alvear.

See also
Vértiz

References

External links

Departments of La Pampa Province